Fabian may refer to:

People
 Fabian (name), including a list of people with the given name or surname
 Pope Fabian (died 250), Catholic saint
 Fabian Forte (born 1943), 1950s American teen idol, singer and actor, known by the mononym Fabian
 Fabian (footballer), Brazilian footballer Fabian Maria Lago Vilela de Abreu (born 1997)
 Fabulous Fabian (born 1970), former ring name of professional wrestler Marcus Alexander Bagwell

Arts and entertainment
 or Fabian, the Story of a Moralist, a novel by German author Erich Kästner
 Fabian (film), a 1980 adaptation of Kästner's novel
 Fabian – Going to the Dogs, a 2021 film adaptation of Kästner's novel

Characters
 Fabian Cortez, a Marvel Comics villain, enemy of the X-Men
 Fabian Prewett in the Harry Potter universe, maternal uncle to Ron Weasley
 Fabian Rutter, from the Nickelodeon television show House of Anubis
 Robert Fabian, protagonist of Fabian of the Yard, a British 1950s television series
 Fabian, in Shakespeare's play Twelfth Night
 Fabian, a cat in the cartoon series Boonie Bears

Other uses
 Fabian (grape), another name for the wine grape Chasselas
 Fabian Society, a socialist society in the UK
 Tropical Storm Fabian, a typhoon, various storms, and a cyclone

See also
 Fabian strategy, a military strategy
 Fabiani, a surname